The Austro-Hungarian Compromise of 1867 established the dual monarchy of Austria-Hungary, which was a military and diplomatic alliance of two sovereign states. The Compromise only partially re-established the former pre-1848 sovereignty and status of the Kingdom of Hungary, being separate from, and no longer subject to, the Austrian Empire. The compromise put an end to the 18-year-long military dictatorship and absolutist rule over Hungary which Emperor Franz Joseph had instituted after the Hungarian Revolution of 1848. The territorial integrity of the Kingdom of Hungary was restored. The agreement also restored the old historic constitution of the Kingdom of Hungary.

Hungarian political leaders had two main goals during the negotiations. One was to regain the traditional status (both legal and political) of the Hungarian state, which had been lost after the Hungarian Revolution of 1848. The other was to restore the series of reform laws (the so-called April Laws) of the revolutionary parliament of 1848, which were based on the 12 points that established modern civil and political rights, economic and societal reforms in Hungary. The April Laws of the Hungarian revolutionary parliament (with the exception of the laws based on the 9th and 10th points) were restored by Franz Joseph.

Under the Compromise, the lands of the House of Habsburg were reorganized as a real union between the Austrian Empire and the Kingdom of Hungary, headed by a single monarch who reigned as Emperor of Austria in the Austrian half of the empire, and as King of Hungary in the Kingdom of Hungary. The Cisleithanian (Austrian) and Transleithanian (Hungarian) states were governed by separate parliaments and prime ministers. The two countries conducted unified diplomatic and defence policies. For these purposes, "common" ministries of foreign affairs and defence were maintained under the monarch's direct authority, as was a third finance ministry responsible only for financing the two "common" portfolios.

The relationship of Hungary to Austria before the 1848 revolution had been  personal union, whereas after the compromise of 1867 her status was reduced to partnership in a real union. Thus Hungarian society widely considered the compromise as a betrayal of the vital Hungarian interests and the achievements of the reforms of 1848. The compromise remained bitterly unpopular among ethnic Hungarian voters: ethnic Hungarians did not generally support the ruling Liberal party in Hungarian parliamentary elections. Therefore, the political maintenance of the Austro-Hungarian Compromise, and thus Austria-Hungary itself, was mostly a result of the popularity of the pro-compromise ruling Liberal Party among ethnic minority voters in the Kingdom of Hungary.

According to Emperor Franz Joseph I of Austria, "There were three of us who made the agreement: Deák, Andrássy and myself."

Historical background

1526–1848

In the Middle Ages, the Duchy of Austria was an autonomous state within the Holy Roman Empire, ruled by the House of Habsburg, and the Kingdom of Hungary was a sovereign state outside the empire. In 1526, Hungary was defeated and partially conquered by the Ottoman Empire. King Louis II of Hungary and Bohemia had no legitimate heir and died young in the Battle of Mohács. Louis II's brother-in-law, Ferdinand I of Habsburg, was elected King of Hungary by a rump Parliament in Pozsony in December 1526. The Ottomans were subsequently driven out of Hungary by international Western Christian forces led by Prince Eugene of Savoy between 1686 and 1699. From 1526 to 1804, Hungary was ruled by the Habsburg dynasty as kings of Hungary, but remained nominally and legally separate from the other lands of the Habsburg monarchy.
Unlike other Habsburg-ruled areas, the Kingdom of Hungary had an old historic constitution, which limited the power of the Crown and had greatly increased the authority of the parliament since the 13th century.

In 1804, Francis II, Holy Roman Emperor, who was also ruler of the lands of the Habsburg monarchy, founded the Empire of Austria in which all his lands were included. In doing so he created a formal overarching structure for the Habsburg Monarchy, which had functioned as a composite monarchy for about 300 years. (Composite states/monarchies were the most common / dominant form of states in early modern era Europe.) Until the 1848 revolution, the workings of the overarching structure and the status of Hungary stayed much the same as they had been before 1804. The Kingdom of Hungary had always been considered a separate realm, the country's status was affirmed by Article X, which was added to Hungary's constitution in 1790 during the phase of the composite monarchy; it described the state as a Regnum Independens. Hungary's affairs continued to be administered by its own institutions (King and Diet) as they had been previously. Thus, under the new arrangements, no Austrian imperial institutions were involved in its internal government. From the perspective of the Court since 1723, regnum Hungariae had been a hereditary province of the dynasty's three main branches on both lines. From the perspective of the ország (the country), Hungary was regnum independens, a separate Land as Article X of 1790 stipulated. In 1804 Emperor Francis II assumed the title of Emperor of Austria for all the Erblande of the dynasty and for the other Lands, including Hungary. Thus Hungary formally became part of the Empire of Austria. The Holy Roman Empire was abolished in 1806. However the involvement of Kingdom of Hungary in a different state was legally impossible, due to the old Hungarian constitution and Hungarian public law. The Court reassured the diet, however, that the assumption of the monarch's newly adopted title (Emperor of Austria) did not in any sense affect the laws and the constitution on the territory of Kingdom  of Hungary. The Hungarian legal system and judicial system remained separated and independent from the unified legal and judicial systems of the other Habsburg ruled areas.

The administration and the structures of central government of Kingdom of Hungary remained separate from the Austrian administration and Austrian government until the 1848 revolution. Hungary was governed to a greater degree by the Council of Lieutenancy of Hungary (the Gubernium) in Pressburg (Pozsony) and, to a lesser extent, by the Hungarian Royal Court Chancellery in Vienna, independent of the Imperial Chancellery of Austria.

"At any time in the past, Hungary might have made peace with a power with which Austria was at war, if the kings had not falsified their oath by not assembling the Hungarian Parliament: for the Diet always had the lawful right of [declaring] War and Peace."

From 1526 to 1851, the Kingdom of Hungary maintained its own customs borders, which separated Hungary from the united customs system of other Habsburg-ruled territories.

While in most Western European countries (like France and the United Kingdom) the king's reign began immediately upon the death of his predecessor, in Hungary the coronation was absolutely indispensable as if it were not properly executed, the Kingdom stayed "orphaned". Even during the long personal union between the Kingdom of Hungary and other Habsburg-ruled areas, no Habsburg monarch could promulgate laws or exercise his royal prerogatives in the territory of Hungary until he had been crowned as King of Hungary. Since the Golden Bull of 1222, all Hungarian monarchs had to take a coronation oath during the coronation procedure, where the new monarchs had to agree to uphold the constitutional arrangement of the country, to preserve the liberties of his subjects and the territorial integrity of the realm.

1849–1867 (military dictatorship)

On 7 March 1849 an imperial proclamation was issued in the name of the emperor Franz Joseph establishing a united constitution for the whole empire, according to the new proclamation, the traditional territorial integrity of Kingdom of Hungary would be terminated and carved up, and it would be administered by five separated military districts, while Principality of Transylvania would be reestablished. Austrian Prime Minister Prince Felix of Schwarzenberg and his government, operating from November 1848, pursued a radically new imperial policy. It wanted to develop a uniform empire in the spirit of the imperial constitution issued by Franz Joseph I in Olmütz on 4 March 1849, and as a result, Hungary's constitution and territorial integrity would be abolished. The centralist March Constitution of Austria introduced neo-absolutism in Habsburg ruled territories, and it provided absolute power for the monarch. The Austrian constitution was accepted by the Imperial Diet of Austria, in which Hungary had no representation and traditionally had no legislative power in the territory of Kingdom of Hungary; still, it also tried to abolish the Diet of Hungary, which existed as the supreme legislative power in Hungary since the late 12th century. The new Austrian constitution also went against the historical constitution of Hungary and tried to nullify it.

In the failed Hungarian Revolution of 1848, the Magyars came close to ending ties with the Habsburg Dynasty, but were defeated by the Austrian Empire only by the military intervention of the Russian Empire. After the restoration of Habsburg power, Hungary was placed under martial law. A military dictatorship was created in Hungary.

Every aspect of Hungarian life would be put under close scrutiny and governmental control.

German became the official language of public administration. An edict issued on 9 October 1849 placed education under state control, the curriculum was prescribed and controlled by the state, the teaching of national history was restricted and history was taught from a Habsburg viewpoint. Even the bastion of Hungarian culture, The academy, was kept under control: the institution was staffed with foreigners, mostly Germans, and the institution was practically defunct until the end of 1858. Hungarians responded with passive resistance. Anti-Habsburg and anti-German sentiments were strong. In the following years, the empire instituted several reforms but failed to resolve problems.

After the Hungarian Revolution of 1848–49, the independent customs system of Hungary was abolished. Hungary became part of the unified imperial customs system on 1 October 1851.

Austrian military and economic crisis and adoption

The suppressing of the 1848 revolutions and the Russian intervention had a very high price.
In 1858 already 40 percent of the Austrian Imperial government's expenditures went to service the state debt. An expensive mobilization during the Crimean War (1853–1856) and a disastrous campaign against Piedmont-Sardinia in 1859 brought the state to the verge of bankruptcy. The threat of fiscal insolvency and the demands of his creditors for an open and credible budgetary process forced the unwilling Franz Joseph to authorize political reform.

In 1866, Austria was completely defeated in the Austro-Prussian War. Its position as the leading state of Germany ended, and the remaining German minor states were soon absorbed into the German Empire, created by Prussia's Bismarck. Austria also lost much of its remaining claims and influence in Italy, which had been its chief foreign policy interest.

After a period of Greater German ambitions, when Austria tried to establish itself as the leading German power, Austria again needed to redefine itself to maintain unity in the face of nationalism.

As a consequence of the Second Italian War of Independence and the Austro-Prussian War, the Habsburg Empire was on the verge of collapse in 1866, as these wars caused monumental state debt and a financial crisis. The Habsburgs were forced to reconcile with Hungary, to save their empire and dynasty. The Habsburgs and part of the Hungarian political elite arranged the Austro-Hungarian Compromise of 1867. The Compromise was arranged and legitimated by a very small part of the Hungarian society (suffrage was very limited: less than 8% of the population had voting rights), and was seen by a very large part of the population as betrayal of the Hungarian cause and the heritage of the 1848–49 War of Independence. This caused deep and lasting cracks in Hungarian society.

Hungarian statesman Ferenc Deák is considered the intellectual force behind the Compromise. Deák initially wanted independence for Hungary and supported the 1848 Revolution, but he broke with hardline nationalists and advocated a modified union under the Habsburgs. Deák believed that while Hungary had the right to full internal independence, the terms of the Pragmatic Sanction of 1723 made questions of defence and foreign affairs "common" to both Austria and Hungary. He also felt that Hungary benefited from continued union with wealthier, more industrialized Austria and that the Compromise would end the continual pressures on Austria to choose between the Magyars and the Slavs of the Kingdom of Hungary. Imperial Chancellor Beust quickly negotiated the Compromise with the Hungarian leaders. Beust was particularly eager to renew the conflict with Prussia and thought a quick settlement with Hungary would make that possible. Franz Joseph and Deák signed the Compromise, and it was ratified by the restored Diet of Hungary on 29 May 1867.

Beust's revenge against Prussia did not materialize. When, in 1870, Beust wanted Austria–Hungary to support France against Prussia, Hungarian Prime Minister Gyula Andrássy was "vigorously opposed" and effectively vetoed Austrian intervention.

The settlement with Hungary consisted then of three parts: the political settlement, which was to be permanent and would remain part of the fundamental constitution of the monarchy; the periodical financial settlement, determining the partition of the common expenses as arranged by the Quota-Deputations and ratified by the parliaments; and the Customs Union and the agreement on currency, a voluntary, reversible arrangement between the two governments and parliaments.

Terms 
Under the Compromise:
 The old historic constitution of Hungary was restored.
 The Hungarian parliament was re-established (which had been the supreme legislative power in Hungary since the 12th century), as it was before 1849. Each part of the Monarchy had its own government, headed by its own prime minister. The "dual monarchy" consisted of the Emperor-King, and the common ministers of foreign affairs, defence, and a finance ministry only for expenditures of the Common Army, navy and diplomatic service.
 The Hungarian legal system and Hungarian laws were restored in the territory of the Kingdom of Hungary. During the negotiations of the compromise, even the April Laws of the Hungarian revolutionary parliament (with the exception of the laws based on the 9th and 10th points) were also accepted by the monarch.
 The traditionally independent and separate judicial system of Hungary was restored. 
 Austria–Hungary, as a common entity, had no jurisdiction and legislative power, which was shaped by the fact that there was no common parliament. The common diplomatic and military affairs were managed by delegations from the Imperial Council and the Hungarian parliament. The delegations had 60 members from the Imperial Council, and 60 members from the Hungarian parliament, and the ratios of various political fractions exactly and proportionally mirrored their own political parties of their parliaments. The members of the delegations from the two parliaments had no right to give speeches, to debate, or introduce new ideas during the meetings; thus they were nothing more than the extended arms of their own parliaments. The only function of the delegates was to cast their votes according to the previously made decisions of their political factions in the Austrian and the Hungarian parliaments. All common decisions had to be ratified by the Austrian parliament to be valid on Austrian territory, and by the Hungarian parliament to be valid on the territory of Kingdom of Hungary. The Austrian and Hungarian delegations hold their joint meeting in Vienna in every odd year, and in Pest in every even year.
 With the exception of the territory of Bosnian Condominium, Austria and Hungary did not form a common sovereign territory in international law. (Ie. Kingdom of Hungary and Empire of Austria were different countries) Thus regarding to territorial changes during peace treaties, the Empire of Austria and Kingdom of Hungary had to act independently as independent countries: A delegate from the Austrian parliament had right to sign peace treaties related to territorial changes of the Austrian Empire, and respectively, a delegate from the Hungarian parliament had right to sign peace treaties regarding to territorial changes of the Kingdom of Hungary. See: Treaty of Saint-Germain and Treaty of Trianon
 A common Ministry of Foreign Affairs was created, responsible for diplomacy and foreign policy. Further information: Foreign Ministry of Austria-Hungary
 There was no common citizenship in Austria–Hungary: one was either an Austrian citizen or a Hungarian citizen, never both. Austria–Hungary used two separate passports: the Austrian passport and the Hungarian one. There was no common passport. 
 A common finance ministry was founded, only for the expenditures of the Common Army, the navy and the diplomatic service and for the issue of banknotes. It was headed by the Common Finance Minister. All other expenditures belonged to the Austrian Finance Ministry in the Austrian Empire and the Hungarian Finance Ministry in the Kingdom of Hungary. The Austrian finance minister was subordinated only to the Minister-President of Austria in the Austrian Empire, and the Hungarian Finance Minister was subordinated only to the Prime Minister of Hungary.  
 The monetary and economic terms of the Compromise and the customs union had to be renegotiated every ten years. 
 Despite Austria and Hungary sharing a common currency, they were fiscally sovereign and independent entities. 
The international commercial treaties and trade agreements were conducted independently by Austria and Hungary, as independent nations. The Common Finance Ministry had no competence in the international commercial treaties and trade agreements of the Austrian state or the Hungarian state. 
 The Royal Hungarian Honvéd was restored, and the Imperial-Royal Landwehr was created, but both states had to continue to finance the Austro-Hungarian Common Army, much larger than both. A common Austro-Hungarian War Ministry was formed immediately for the large Common Army, but it had no right to command directly the smaller Austrian Landwehr and the Hungarian Honvéd armies, which were respectively placed under the direct control of the separate Austrian and Hungarian Ministries of Defence. The Austrian and Hungarian Ministers of Defence were not placed under the command and jurisdiction of the Common War Ministry; they were subordinated only to their own prime ministers and the respective parliaments in Vienna and Budapest. The Hungarian Honvéd army could join the imperial army only with the explicit authorization of the Hungarian government. Further information: Imperial and Royal Ministry of War
Hungary took on a large part of the towering Austrian state debt. 
The Emperor-King held all authority over the structure, organization, and administration of the three armies. He appointed the senior officials, had the right to declare war, and was the commander-in-chief of the army.
The Emperor-King had the right to declare a state of emergency.
The Emperor-King had the right of preliminary royal assent to every bill the Cabinet Council wanted to report to the National Assembly. He had the right to veto any law passed by the National Assemblies.
The Emperor-King had the right to dissolve the National Assemblies and of the declaration of new parliamentary elections.
The Emperor-King had the right to appoint and dismiss the members of the Cabinet Councils.

The power of the monarch significantly increased in a comparison with the pre-1848 status of Hungary. This meant a great reduction in Hungarian sovereignty and autonomy, even in comparison with the pre-1848 status quo.

Continuing pressures

The dominance of ethnic minority elected Liberal Party in the Hungarian Parliament

The Austro-Hungarian compromise and its supporting liberal parliamentary parties remained bitterly unpopular among the ethnic Hungarian voters, and the continuous successes of these pro-compromise Liberal Party in the Hungarian parliamentary elections caused long lasting frustration for Hungarians. The ethnic minorities had the key role in the political maintenance of the compromise in Hungary, because they were able to vote the pro-compromise liberal parties into the position of the majority/ruling parties of the Hungarian parliament. The pro-compromise liberal parties were the most popular among ethnic minority voters, however i.e. the Slovak, Serb and Romanian minority parties remained unpopular among their own ethnic minority voters. The coalitions of Hungarian nationalist parties – which were supported by the overwhelming majority of ethnic Hungarian voters – always remained in the opposition, with the exception of the 1906–1910 period, where the Hungarian-supported nationalist parties were able to form a government.

Ethnic minorities
Before the World War I, only three European countries declared ethnic minority rights, and enacted minority-protecting laws: the first was Hungary (1849 and 1868), the second was Austria (1867), and the third was Belgium (1898). In contrast, the legal systems of other pre-WW1 era European countries did not allow the use of European minority languages in primary schools, in cultural institutions, in offices of public administration and at the legal courts.

The resulting system was maintained until the dissolution of the dual monarchy after World War I. The favoritism shown to the Magyars, the second largest ethnic group in the dual monarchy after the Germans, caused discontent on the part of other ethnic groups like the Slovaks and Romanians. Although a "Nationalities Law" was enacted to preserve the rights of ethnic minorities, the two parliaments took very different approaches to this issue.

The basic problem in the later years was that the Compromise with Hungary only encouraged the appetites of non-Hungarian minorities in Hungary that were historically within the boundaries of the Hungarian Kingdom. The majority of Hungarians felt they had accepted the Compromise only under coercion. The Hungarian monarchs were always crowned as King of Hungary, due to the Hungarian coronation oath they had to agree to uphold the old constitutional arrangements of the country and preserve the territorial integrity of the Hungarian realm. This coronation oath was obligatory for the Hungarian monarchs during the coronation process since the Golden Bull of 1222. The Hungarians, who were regarded as equal after the Compromise, only partially acquiesced to granting "their" minorities recognition and local autonomy.

In the Kingdom of Hungary, several ethnic minorities faced increased pressures of Magyarization. Further, the renegotiation that occurred every ten years often led to constitutional crises. Ultimately, although the Compromise hoped to fix the problems faced by a multi-national state while maintaining the benefits of a large state, the new system still faced the same internal pressures as the old. To what extent the dual monarchy stabilized the country in the face of national awakenings and to what extent it alleviated or aggravated the situation is still debated today.

In a letter on 1 February 1913, to Foreign Minister Berchtold, Archduke Franz Ferdinand said that "irredentism in our country ... will cease immediately if our Slavs are given a comfortable, fair and good life" instead of being trampled on (as they were being trampled on by the Hungarians).

Influence in Ireland

As early as the mid-1880s, Lord Salisbury, leader of the British Conservative Party, had contemplated using the 1867 Austro-Hungarian example as a model for a reformed relationship between Britain and Ireland. In 1904 Arthur Griffith published the highly influential book The Resurrection of Hungary: A Parallel for Ireland, setting out a detailed proposal for an Anglo-Irish dual monarchy similar to the Austro-Hungarian one. This dual monarchy model was advocated by Griffith's Sinn Féin party in its early years of existence and had a considerable influence on the development of Irish Nationalism - though after the Easter Rising and subsequent October 1917 Ardfheis, it was dropped in favor of Irish Republicanism.

See also 
 Fundamental Articles of 1871

References

Sources 
.
.
.
.
.
.

External links
 Chronology of the Compromise
 The Dual Monarchy in Hungary
 Nationalism in Hungary

1867 in Austria-Hungary
1867 in international relations
1867 in the Austrian Empire
1867 in Hungary
Constitutional history of Austria
Hungary under Habsburg rule
Territorial evolution of Hungary
1867 establishments in the Austrian Empire
1867 establishments in Austria-Hungary
1867 establishments in Hungary
June 1867 events
Real unions
Political compromises in Europe
Franz Joseph I of Austria